Dhiraj Vinod Kapoor (earlier known as Dheeraj Kapoor Alias Dheiraj Kapoor, Dhirajj Vinodd Kapoor) is an Indian actor, model, director, board advisor, consultant, producer and entrepreneur.  Kapoor is known for his modeling assignments with Honda Activa TVC, Byford T-shirts Campaign, Gurukul Campaign, BPL net.com Campaign, andIBM computers Campaigns.

Early life 
Dhiraj Vinod Kapoor was born in Bangalore, India, on 25 October 1978; His mother Viney Rani Kapoor was a housewife and his father, Vinod Kumar Kapoor was a businessman, based out of Bangalore.

His sister, Anju Kapoor, was married to Captain Mustafa Jaglul Wahid - the brother of Bangladeshi singer Ferdous Wahid.

Career 

Dhiraj Vinod Kapoor started his career with modeling assignments with Honda Activa TVC, Byford T-shirts Campaign, Gurukul Campaign, BPL net.com Campaign, and IBM computers Campaigns. Kapoor has acted in four English plays with Mahesh Dattani and also acted in a Hindi play while doing his summer course in National School of Drama.

In his early 20s Dhiraj moved away from his family retail business and started Limelight in the millennium year with his close friend. In 2005, to expand further, he moved to Mumbai, establishing himself nationally and internationally as a producer. Moving back into India from Los Angeles with the conviction to do differentiated assignments for varied ventures in different industries such as Cinema, Arts, Culture, Entertainment & Information Technology, he has taken his entrepreneurial skills with the launch of his new company Dhirajj Walks of Art Pvt Ltd.

Philanthropy 

He is also into charitable and philanthropist initiatives and recently took up the noble cause towards the fight for cancer event in association with Indian Cancer Society.

Filmography

References

External links
Official website
Personal website

1978 births
21st-century Indian male actors
Male actors in Hindi cinema
Indian male models
Punjabi people
Film producers from Mumbai
Hindi film producers
Indian film producers
Living people
Male actors from Bangalore
Indian male film actors